The Hector River is a river of New Zealand's southern North Island. It rises on the northern slopes of Mount Hector in the Tararua Range, flowing east through Tararua Forest Park before joining with the upper reaches of the Waiohine River.

See also
List of rivers of New Zealand

References

Rivers of the Wellington Region
Rivers of New Zealand